Dan Walsh is a British banjoist  and guitarist.  He is known for the wide variety of banjo techniques he includes in his performances, and for his particular skill at clawhammer style banjo.

Walsh has performed as a duo with harmonica player Will Pound. He also played on the folk musician Sunjay's self-titled album in 2014.
In 2014 he joined The Urban Folk Quartet. The group's album The Escape, was included in the Telegraph's list of Best Albums of 2015.

Discography
Tomorrow's Still to Come, 2009
Come What May, 2013, with Clutching at Straws
Sunjay, 2014, with Sunjay
Incidents and Accidents, 2015
The Escape, 2015, with Urban Folk Quartet
Live III, 2016, with Urban Folk Quartet
Verging on the Perpendicular, 2017

References

Year of birth missing (living people)
Living people
Place of birth missing (living people)
British banjoists
British male guitarists